The 2022 UC San Diego Tritons men's volleyball team represents the University of California San Diego in the 2022 NCAA Division I & II men's volleyball season. The Tritons, led by seventeenth year head coach Kevin Ring, play their home games at the RIMAC. The Tritons compete as members of the Big West Conference and were picked to finish sixth in the Big West preseason poll.

Roster

Schedule
TV/Internet Streaming/Radio information:
ESPN+ will carry all home and conference road games. All other road broadcasts will be carried by the schools respective streaming partner. 

 *-Indicates conference match.
 Times listed are Pacific Time Zone.

Rankings 

^The Media did not release a Pre-season poll or a Post-Conference Tournament poll.

References

2022 in sports in California
2022 NCAA Division I & II men's volleyball season
UC San Diego